The Nocturne is the eighth and final Korean extended play by South Korean boy group NU'EST. It was released on May 11, 2020 by Pledis Entertainment and distributed by Genie Music and Stone Music Entertainment. It consists of six songs, including the lead single "I'm in Trouble".

Release 
The album was released on May 11, 2020, through several music portals, including MelOn and Apple Music.

Commercial performance 
The album debuted atop the Gaon Album Chart on the week ending May 16, 2020. It also debuted at number 22 on the Oricon Albums Chart with 1,133 copies sold and at number 27 on the Oricon Combined Albums Chart. The album also debuted at number 37 on Billboard Japan's Hot Albums and at number 16 on Top Download Albums.

A month later, the EP re-entered two main charts in Japan achieving a new peak, the Oricon Albums Chart with additional 6,665 copies sold at number 5, and Billboard Japan's Hot Albums at number 7.

Track listing

Charts

Accolades

Music programs awards

References 
2020 EPs
NU'EST albums
Hybe Corporation EPs